In organic chemistry, an intramolecular Diels-Alder cycloaddition is a Diels–Alder reaction in which the diene and a dienophile are both part of the same molecule. The reaction leads to the formation of the same cyclohexene-like structure as usual for a Diels–Alder reaction, but as part of a more complex fused or bridged cyclic ring system.  This reaction gives rise to various natural derivatives of decalin.

Reaction products
Because the two reacting groups are already attached, two basic modes of addition are possible in this reaction. Depending on whether the tether that links to the dienophile is attached to the end or the middle of the diene, fused or bridged polycyclic ring systems can be formed.

The tether than attaches the two reacting groups also affects the geometry of the reaction. As a result of its conformational and other structural restrictions, the exo vs endo results are usually not based on the simple (intermolecular) Diels–Alder reaction effects.

Applications 
Intramolecular Diels-Alder cycloaddition is extremely useful for the formation of naturally occurring polycyclic rings.  The reaction provides ready access to polycyclic compounds with a great deal of stereoselectivity.  The following are several useful drugs whose complete synthesis has been accomplished using the intramolecular Diels-Alder reaction.

Solanapyrone A
Solanapyrone A is an inhibitor of mammalian DNA polymerase β and λ, repair type DNA polymerase.  The compound was isolated from the phytopathogenic fungi Alternaria solani, the cause of early blight in tomato and potato plants.

Salvinorin A
Isolated from the hallucinogenic sage Salvia divinorum, Salvinorin A is a potent and selective κ-opioid agonist.  The compound has potential uses in psychotherapuetic treatments and Alzheimer's treatment.

Himbacine
Himbacine is a potent  muscarinic receptor antagonist, Isolated from the bark of Galbulimima baccata, a type of magnolia tree.  The drug is a promising lead in Alzheimer's disease research.

References

Name reactions
Cycloadditions